Godfried is the Dutch form of Geoffrey and Gottfried. It may refer to:

Carel Godfried Willem Hendrik baron van Boetzelaer van Oosterhout (1892–1986), Dutch diplomat and politician
Eugène Godfried (1952–2009), Curaçao-born political activist and broadcaster
Godfried Aduobe (born 1975), former Ghanaian football midfielder
Godfried Bomans (1913–1971), popular Dutch author and television personality and a prominent Dutch catholic
Godfried Danneels (1933–2019), Belgian cardinal of the Roman Catholic Church
Godfried Dejonckheere (born 1952), retired Belgian race walker
Godfried Donkor (born 1964), Ghanaian artist, living and working in London
Godfried Schalcken (1643–1706), Dutch genre and portrait painter
Godfried Toussaint, Research Professor of Computer Science at New York University Abu Dhabi (NYUAD)
Godfried van Mierlo (1518–1587), bishop of Haarlem and abbot of Egmond Abbey from 1570 to 1578
Godfried-Willem Raes, Belgian composer, performer and instrument maker
Hendrik Godfried Duurkoop (1736–1778), Dutch merchant-trader and diplomat
Jan Joseph Godfried van Voorst tot Voorst (1880–1963), the second highest officer in command of the Dutch armed forces during World War II
Jan Joseph Godfried van Voorst tot Voorst (politician) (1846–1931), Dutch politician and lieutenant-general of the Dutch army
Michiel Godfried Eman or Mike Eman (born 1961), Aruban politician who is the 5th Prime Minister of Aruba
Pieter Godfried Maria van Meeuwen (1899–1982), Dutch lawyer and a politician

See also
Godefroid (disambiguation)
Godfrey (name)
Gotfrid
Gottfried
Gudfred

Dutch masculine given names